Cheung Mei Han (born 18 December 1965) is a Hong Kong sailor. She competed in the women's 470 event at the 1996 Summer Olympics.

References

External links
 

1965 births
Living people
Hong Kong female sailors (sport)
Olympic sailors of Hong Kong
Sailors at the 1996 Summer Olympics – 470
Place of birth missing (living people)
Asian Games medalists in sailing
Sailors at the 1994 Asian Games
Medalists at the 1994 Asian Games
Asian Games bronze medalists for Hong Kong
20th-century Hong Kong women